Eulima chyta is a species of sea snail, a marine gastropod mollusk in the family Eulimidae. The species is one of a number within the genus Eulima.

Description 
The maximum recorded shell length is 2.2 mm.

Habitat 
Minimum recorded depth is 768 m. Maximum recorded depth is 768 m.

References

External links

chyta
Gastropods described in 1883